Francesca Deagostini (born 5 August 1996) is an Italian artistic gymnast.  She was an alternate for the Italian team at the 2012 Summer Olympics.

Junior career

2010 
At the end of April, Deagostini competed at the European Championships in Birmingham, United Kingdom. She contributed an all around score of 51.525 toward the Italian team's third-place finish.

2011 
In May, Deagostini competed at the Italian Championships in Meda, Italy. She placed third in the all around competition with a score of 55.100. In event finals, she placed second on balance beam scoring 14.550, second on uneven bars scoring 13.850,  and third on floor scoring 14.300.

Senior career

2012 
In January, Deagostini competed at the London Prepares series in London, United Kingdom.  She helped the Italian team win first place which meant that they qualified a full team to the 2012 Summer Olympics.  In event finals, she placed fifth on balance beam with a score of 14.133.

In May, Deagostini competed at the European Championships in Brussels, Belgium.  She contributed a balance beam score of 14.300 toward the Italian team's third-place finish.

References

External links 

Italian female artistic gymnasts
Living people
1996 births
People from Aosta